Nebelivka, or Nebelovka, located in the village of the same name in Kirovohrad Oblast, Ukraine, is the site of an ancient mega-settlement dating to 4000 B.C. belonging to the Cucuteni-Trypillian culture. The settlement was for the time huge, covering an area of 260-300 hectares and home to perhaps 15,000 - 17,000 people. The settlement within the boundary ditch includes over 1200 structures. Research from 2012 to 2014 imply "the possibility of state-level societies", contemporary with similar developments in Uruk. Mega-structures "suggest the presence of public buildings for meetings or ceremonies".

Temple

A two-storey structure 60 by 20 meters of mud and wood with a galleried courtyard has been excavated. Its structure and contents indicate it was a major temple. Artefacts include female or Venus figurines, pottery stylised faces, charred bones of animals, and small gold pieces that were perhaps hair or clothing ornaments. It has eight clay platforms, perhaps altars, and the floors and walls of all five rooms on the upper floor were "decorated by red paint, which created [a] ceremonial atmosphere."

See also
 Cucuteni-Trypillian culture
 Old Europe (archaeology)

References

Cucuteni–Trypillia culture
Megasites